Face to Face is a 1982 album by Oscar Peterson, accompanied by Freddie Hubbard.

Track listing

Personnel

Performance
 Oscar Peterson – piano
 Freddie Hubbard – trumpet
 Joe Pass – guitar
 Niels-Henning Ørsted Pedersen – double bass
 Martin Drew – drums

Production
 Producer – Norman Granz
 Recording Engineer – Dennis S. Sands
 Remix Engineer – Andy Daddario
 Remastering, 1997 – Joe Tarantino (Fantasy Studios)

References

1982 albums
Oscar Peterson albums
Freddie Hubbard albums
Albums produced by Norman Granz
Pablo Records albums
Collaborative albums